Jessica Anne Rodriguez Maitim (born August 22, 1969), better known as Jean Garcia, is a Filipino television actress, model and dancer, who hails from Angeles City. She is best known as the country's "Ultimate Kontrabida" for her remarkable portrayal as Madam Claudia Buenavista in the original version of Pangako Sa 'Yo and as Miss Minchin in the 1995 live-action remake of Sarah... Ang Munting Prinsesa.

Garcia is easily one of the most recognizable and celebrated female antagonists in Philippine film and television. She is a recipient of a Gawad Urian Award, Golden Screen Award and has received multiple nominations from FAMAS Awards.

Biography
She attended Trinity University of Asia (formerly Trinity College of Quezon City) in Quezon City until she was discovered in a noontime show Kalatog Pinggan. She has two children, Jennica Garcia and Kotaro.

Career
Her most famous role was in the soap opera Pangako Sa 'Yo (2000) where she played antagonist Madam Claudia Buenavista. Her next landmark role is in the critically acclaimed Kay Tagal Kang Hinintay (2002) as Lady Morganna. She also starred in the first musical fantaserye Kampanerang Kuba, and the cooking show Makuha Ka sa Tikim. She moved to ABS-CBN's rival network GMA Network, playing villainous roles in primetime shows like Impostora, La Vendetta, Majika and others. She is recently in the said network's newest telefantasya, Dyesebel. Garcia played Abresia in Gagambino.

She was the cover of FHM Philippines' October 2008 issue. Garcia played "Sister Maria Belonia" in Shake, Rattle & Roll X, a Metro Manila Film Festival (MMFF) entry. After Gagambino, she appeared in All About Eve, where she worked with Sunshine Dizon, Iza Calzado, Richard Gomez and Eula Valdez. She later joined the cast of the witchcraft series Ilumina. Garcia recently played the reprising role of Diony in the TV remake of Pinulot Ka Lang sa Lupa, which is based on the 1987 film of the same title released by Regal Entertainment (originally portrayed by Eddie Garcia).

Filmography

Films

Television

Awards and nominations
Metro Manila Film Festival
 1996: Best Supporting Actress Winner for Trudis Liit
PMPC Star Awards for Television:
 2000: Best Actress Winner for Pangako Sa 'Yo 
 2006: Best Single Performance by an Actress Nomination for Magpakailanman: Kalbaryo ng Isang Ina
 2005: Best Supporting Drama Actress Nomination for Kampanerang Kuba
Golden Screen Awards:
 2014: Outstanding Performance by an Actress in a Single Drama/Telemovie Program Pending Nominee for Magpakailanman: Hinagpis ng Isang Ina
 2013: Outstanding Supporting Actress in a Drama Series Nomination for One True Love
 2012: Outstanding Performance by an Actress in a Leading Role Winner for Ang Sayaw ng Dalawang Kaliwang Paa
 2003: Outstanding Supporting Actress in a Drama Series Winner for It Might Be You
Gawad Tanglaw Awards
 2014: Best Performance by an Actress Winner for Magpakailanman: Hinagpis ng Isang Ina 
GMA Box Office Group
 2007: Best Box Office Actress Nomination

References

External links
 

1969 births
Living people
Actresses from Pampanga
Filipino film actresses
Filipino television actresses
Filipino female models
Filipino female dancers
Filipino women comedians
People from Angeles City
Kapampangan people
That's Entertainment Tuesday Group Members
That's Entertainment (Philippine TV series)
Filipino television variety show hosts
GMA Network personalities
ABS-CBN personalities